Cydia ulicetana is a moth of the  family Tortricidae. It is native to western Europe, but was introduced to Hawaii.

The wingspan is 12–16 mm. Adults are on wing in May and in the south again from July to September in western Europe. Males fly in sunshine, while the females tend to be more crepuscular.

The larvae feed internally in the seedpods of various plants, including Ulex (such as Ulex europaeus) and Cytisus species.

External links
 
 UKmoths

Grapholitini
Moths described in 1811
Moths of Europe
Taxa named by Adrian Hardy Haworth